The Chennai Super Kings–Mumbai Indians rivalry is a cricket rivalry between the IPL teams of Chennai Super Kings and Mumbai Indians in the Indian Premier League (IPL) and the defunct Champions League Twenty20 (CLT20).  Also known as the El Clasico of the IPL, the two teams have played each other 34 times in IPL and twice in CLT20 which is the most number of times any two IPL teams have faced off each other, with the Mumbai Indians having more victories (21). They are the two most successful teams in the league winning a combined 9 titles out of the 15 IPL seasons. 2022 was the first season when none of the both sides were able to advance to the play-off stage.

Mumbai and Chennai are also considered as two of the biggest metropolitan cities in India and also represent the capital cities of the two largest states of India by GDP, Maharashtra and Tamil Nadu and are also the largest cities on the western and eastern coasts of India respectively. In addition, the two largest film industries in India, the Hindi film industry (Bollywood) and the Tamil film industry (Kollywood) are based in Mumbai and Chennai respectively.

The highest run scorer from this fixture is Suresh Raina of Chennai Super Kings with 736 runs in 32 matches against Mumbai Indians, closely followed by Mumbai Indians skipper Rohit Sharma with 711 runs in 30 outings.

Summary of results

Head-to-head ranking in IPL(2008–2021)
 Total: Chennai Super Kings with 9 higher finishes, Mumbai Indians with 4 higher finishes (as of the end of the 2022 IPL).
 The biggest difference in positions for Chennai Super Kings from Mumbai Indians is 4 places (2018 IPL & 2021 IPL), The biggest difference in positions for Mumbai Indians from Chennai Super Kings is 6 places (2020 IPL).
 There was no Head to Head clash between Chennai Super Kings and Mumbai Indians in 2016 and 2017 seasons due to the former team was suspended.
  Chennai Super Kings
  Mumbai Indians

Summary of Championships

Most IPL Titles

Most Champions League T20 Titles

Meetings in IPL

IPL 2008

IPL 2009

IPL 2010

Final

IPL 2011

IPL 2012

Eliminator

IPL 2013

Qualifier 1

Final

IPL 2014

 

Eliminator

IPL 2015

Qualifier 1

Final

IPL 2018

IPL 2019

Qualifier 1

Final

IPL 2020

IPL 2021

IPL 2022

Meetings in CLT20

CLT20 2011

CLT20 2012

Individual records

Most Runs

Highest Score

Most Wickets

Best Bowling Figures

Last updated: 17 May 2022

Other records 

 Highest Total: Mumbai Indians
 219-6 (20) at Arun Jaitley Stadium (1 May 2021) 
 Highest successful chase: Mumbai Indians
 219-6 (20) at Arun Jaitley Stadium (1 May 2021) 
 Lowest Total: Chennai Super Kings
 79  (15.2) at Wankhede Stadium (5 May 2013)
 Fastest Fifty: Kieron Pollard (MI)
 17 balls at Arun Jaitley Stadium (1 May 2021)
 Fastest Century: Sanath Jayasuriya (MI)
 45 balls at Wankhede Stadium (14 May 2008)

List of players who played for both sides

See also
List of Chennai Super Kings records
List of Mumbai Indians records
India–Pakistan sports rivalries
List of sports rivalries

References

Indian Premier League rivalries
Chennai Super Kings
Mumbai Indians